Matilda Fitzroy (c. 1080/1100 – 25 November 1120), Countess of Perche, was among several members of the English royal family who died in the wreck of the White Ship off Barfleur.

Life

Matilda, or Maud, was an illegitimate daughter of King Henry I of England by a mistress identified only as Edith. Nothing is known of her mother's family. Her father was the youngest son of William the Conqueror and his wife Matilda of Flanders.

During the High Middle Ages, illegitimate children were not always acknowledged by their fathers (and so many remained unknown) but Henry I recognised at least 20 of his 'natural' children, including Maud.<ref>Walter Lee Sheppard, Jr., Royal Bye-Blows, The Illegitimate Children of the English Kings From William I to Edward III', The New England Historical and Genealogical Register, Vol. 119 (April 1965), pp. 94–5</ref> She was identified as his daughter by Orderic Vitalis, who added that the king built up her husband's power by greatly augmenting his estates and wealth in England. Her father gave her lands in Wiltshire as her dowry.

In 1103, Matilda married Rotrou III, Count of Perche, as his second wife. She married at the same time as her half-sister Juliane de Fontevrault. Rotrou was a direct vassal of King Henry in England, where he held fiefs jure uxoris, in right of his wife. He also was given the de Bellelme fief in Normandy at the forfeiture of Robert de Belleme.

White Ship

In the wreck of the White Ship'', the evening of 25 November 1120, William of Malmesbury noted the fate of the countess:

Family

Matilda and Rotrou had two daughters:
 Philippa, married Elias II, Count of Maine and had issue
 Felicia

Notes

References

1120 deaths
Deaths on the White Ship
Illegitimate children of Henry I of England
12th-century English people
12th-century English women
Year of birth unknown
11th-century English people
11th-century English women
11th-century French people
11th-century French women
12th-century French people
12th-century French women
Daughters of kings